Hadi Ta'mini (born August 23, 1981) is an Iranian footballer who currently plays for Sepidrood in Persian Gulf Pro League. He spend his golden years with Malavan.

Club career

Club career statistics
Last Update: 24 August 2015

Honours
Iran's Premier Football League
Winner: 1
2011–12 with Sepahan
Hazfi Cup
Runner-up: 1
2013–14 with Mes Kerman

References

1981 births
Living people
Malavan players
Sepahan S.C. footballers
Sepidrood Rasht players
Iranian footballers
Association football defenders
People from Rasht
Sportspeople from Gilan province